The Suzuki FZ50 was a step-through commuter moped, described by a Motor Cycle News road tester in 1979 as "the most attractive  moped I've seen and must take the run-about class into a new area of perfection" with "sporty alloy spoked wheels" but having small, "ineffective" legshields with footpegs, not footboards.

Produced by Suzuki, it was known by the nickname "Suzy" in UK, but in other markets as Youdy. It had a  two-stroke pivoted engine integral with the transmission, and a coil-over damper mounted to the single-sided swinging arm enclosing the chain final drive.

Restricted to 30 mph and with an automatic transmission, the engine used Suzuki's CCI oil-injection lubrication system with underseat separate fuel and oil tanks, a fuel gauge and front and rear carriers. 

There were no pedals, unlike most Scooter, instead using a left-side-mounted engine kick-start, normally found on larger machines, with a lock-out operated by the handlebar-mounted rear brake lever.

References

FZ50
Motor scooters
Two-stroke motorcycles
Motorcycles introduced in 1979